The Interrupted Honeymoon is a 1936 British comedy film directed by Leslie S. Hiscott and starring Jane Carr, Helen Haye and Jack Hobbs. It was made at Beaconsfield Studios. In the film, a couple returning home from a honeymoon in Paris find that their flat has been taken over by their friends.

Cast
In alphabetical order
 Jane Carr as Greta 
 Helen Haye as Aunt Harriet 
 Jack Hobbs as George 
 David Horne as Colonel Craddock 
 Claude Hulbert as Victor 
 Martita Hunt as Nora Briggs 
 Glennis Lorimer as  Edith Hobson 
 Wally Patch as Police Constable 
 Francis L. Sullivan as Alphonse 
 Hugh Wakefield as Uncle John 
 Hal Walters as Valet 
 Robb Wilton as Henry Briggs

Critical reception
TV Guide gave the film three out of five stars, appreciating there were "Some good moments in an extremely lively comedy."

References

Bibliography
 Low, Rachael. Filmmaking in 1930s Britain. George Allen & Unwin, 1985.
 Wood, Linda. British Films, 1927-1939. British Film Institute, 1986.

External links

1936 films
British comedy films
British black-and-white films
1936 comedy films
1930s English-language films
Films directed by Leslie S. Hiscott
Films shot at Beaconsfield Studios
Films produced by Herbert Smith (producer)
British films based on plays
1930s British films